Manson is a surname of Scottish origin.

Manson may also refer to:

Places

Canada 
the Manson River, a river in the Omineca region British Columbia
Manson Arm, an arm of Lake Williston in the Rocky Mountain Trench
Mansons Landing, British Columbia, a settlement on Cortes Island, British Columbia
Mansons Landing Provincial Park, a park at that settlement
Manson Creek, British Columbia, a former settlement in the Omineca Region of British Columbia
Manson Creek (British Columbia), one of three creeks of that name in British Columbia
Manson, Manitoba

United States
Manson, Indiana
Manson, Iowa
Manson, Washington
Manson, Wisconsin, a ghost town

Other
Manson (film), an Oscar-nominated 1973 documentary
Manson Gibson (born 1963), a retired American kickboxer

See also

 
 Mansson (disambiguation)
 Mansion (disambiguation)
 Mans (disambiguation)
 Man (disambiguation)
 Son (disambiguation)
 Son of man (disambiguation)